Sonomyn Luvsangombo or Luvsangombo Sonom is a Mongolian general and engineer. From 1982 to 1984, he was the Minister of Public Security of the Mongolian People's Republic. In the 7th, 8th, 9th and 10th parliamentary elections of the Mongolian People's Republic, he was elected a member of the Great People's Khural.

Biography 
He was born in 1924 in Khatanbulag, Dornogovi. After attending the Higher Military School in Ulaanbaatar, Luvsangombo studied at the Academy of Military Engineering in the Soviet Union. He was then an instructor and employee of the supply department of the Ministry of Construction between 1948 and 1956, where he was then chief engineer from 1956 to 1959. From 1952 to 1984, he worked in the office of Prime Minister Yumjaagiin Tsedenbal as a commissioner. From 1971 to 1972, he was Chairman of the Executive Office of the People's Assembly of Ulaanbaatar,  For ten years after, he served as Deputy Prime Minister and Chairman of the Construction Architecture Commission. In 1982, he became Minister of Public Security. From 1984 to 1989, he served as Deputy Chairman of the Council of Ministers and then retired. In February 1982, he was member of the Politburo of the Central Committee of the MPRP and remained in that capacity until 1989.

Awards
Order of Sukhbaatar
Order of the Polar Star
Medal of Merit
Order of Military Merit
Awarded other medals.

References 

Mongolian politicians
Generals
Colonel generals
1924 births
Possibly living people